The Ida'an (also Idahan) language is a Malayo-Polynesian language spoken by the Ida'an people on the east coast of Sabah, Malaysia.

Background
The language has a long literary history; the earliest known work in the language is a manuscript dated 1408 A.D. The manuscript, written using the Jawi script, gives an account of an Ida'an man named Abdullah in Darvel Bay who embraced Islam, with the region thus becoming one of the earliest known regions in Malaysia to embrace Islam. The Ida'an, Begak and Subpan peoples originally formed one ethnic group. The Ida'an converted to Islam following the conversion of Abdullah, while the Begak and Subpan continued to practice their traditional religion.

Varieties
The Ida'an language has been described as having three dialects: Ida'an proper (spoken in Sagama and several villages west of Lahad Datu), Begak (spoken in Ulu Tungku and several villages east of Lahad Datu), and Subpan (spoken in the districts of Kinabatangan and Sandakan). These dialects correspond to three ethnic groups who originally formed a single group.

Lobel (2016) lists Sungai Seguliud and Begak as Idaanic languages (language varieties closely related to Ida'an proper). The Begak dialect is said to be threatened with extinction, as younger speakers are switching to Malay.

Phonology

Vowels

Consonants

References

Sources

Northeast Sabahan languages
Languages of Malaysia
Endangered Austronesian languages